Georges Kopp (October 10, 1902 – July 15, 1951) was a Belgian educated engineer and inventor of Russian descent, who volunteered in the fight against Nazism and is best known for his friendship with George Orwell, whom he commanded in the Spanish Civil War.

The Engineer
Georges Kopp was born in St. Petersburg to Russian parents with Ashkenazi Jewish origins. In 1909, the family fled Tzarist Russia and settled close to Brussels in Schaerbeek. The family moved again in 1915 to Lausanne, before returning to Schaerbeek in 1920, where Kopp studied Civil Engineering at the Université libre de Bruxelles. In 1921, Kopp’s father died leaving the family in debt and forcing Kopp to interrupt his studies to earn money, working as an engineer to support his family, initially living with his mother in Schaerbeek.

Kopp worked for a firm of heating manufacturers (Société Chaurobel) from 1923 until 1932. In 1925, he married Germaine Warnotte, the daughter of a prominent socialist and together they raised five children over the next ten years. The onset of the Great Depression resulted in Kopp being laid off from work in 1933. He struggled to make a living as a consultant, running up bills and allegedly having affairs. Germaine, discovering his infidelity, divorced him in 1935. The following year, after an argument with his mother, Kopp left for France to consider his future, overwhelmed with regret and missing his family.

The Soldier

Spanish Civil War
In October 1936, Kopp crossed the border from France into Spain and volunteered as an officer for the Republicans by joining the POUM militia column. He first saw active service on the Aragon front near Zaragoza, followed by Huesca. In December, the POUM militia was absorbed into the Catalan Army and later became the 29th Division. George Orwell crossed in to Spain in the same month, joining the 29th Division with Kopp as his brigade commander. Orwell describes how his "comandante" (Kopp) led them to the front in January 1937 and the various acts of personal bravery that followed over the next 115 days at the front. Orwell and Kopp developed a close working relationship over this period, establishing lasting mutual trust and respect. There were inconsistencies in Kopp's account of his background, which Orwell was, uncharacteristically, not aware of at the time. Thus, his book on the Spanish War, Homage to Catalonia contains false details on Kopp's past as a 'Belgian officer' and weapon-smuggler who had 'given enverything up' to save the Spanish republic.

Kopp and Orwell left the front late in April 1937 for rest and relaxation in Barcelona and became caught up in Barcelona May Days as Government Guards moved against the Anarchists. Kopp risked his life to stop the fighting at the Café Moka, but the ideological war within the republican movement was to end in disaster for Kopp. Orwell had been joined in Barcelona by his wife Eileen, who was working with the ILP Contingent of British volunteers attached to POUM. It is widely believed that Eileen had a relationship with Kopp at this time, as the Orwells had a "somewhat open marriage". Orwell returned to the trenches and was shot through the throat by a sniper's bullet, ending his participation in the war. Kopp was on hand to help his friend but returned to the front to participate in the Battle of Chimillas.

In June, Kopp decided to leave the POUM, securing a testimonial letter describing him as "a person of confidence" by General Pozas, who was commanding the Army in the East. He travelled to Valencia to register his new position as an engineer, having risen to become captain in the general staff of the 45th Mixed Brigade of the Spanish Republican Army. On 16 June, the POUM was declared illegal, resulting in its members, and former members, being arrested and thrown into jail. Purges against the POUM raged through Barcelona in secret to stop the news getting to the front where the POUM was still holding the line. Kopp had been advised to remain in Valencia to allow the dust to settle, which he ignored, possibly because he had "simply not taken it seriously enough". He was arrested as soon as he arrived at his hotel in Barcelona, his papers confiscated, and imprisoned under appalling conditions. Orwell and Eileen visited Kopp in jail, immediately recognising the importance of the letter. Orwell successfully traced the letter to the chief of police and managed to get it transferred to the military authorities, exposing himself to arrest in the process. The last time Orwell saw Kopp in Spain was on 22 June 1937, the day before he and Eileen slipped across the border into France.

Kopp was one of thousands of volunteers who fought in Spain to oppose fascism and was imprisoned by its own side, under the banner of an ideological purge imposed by the NKVD directed by Stalin. Kopp was interrogated, tortured and moved between prisons, detention camps in and around Barcelona for the next 18 months, largely out of sight.

World War II

Kopp was released in December 1938 a free man but in a severely reduced state, flying to Toulouse before making his way to Brussels to see his daughter. He had survived by building stories around himself, accused by the Communists of being a Trotskyist and dismissed by Trotsky himself as politically “centrist”. Whatever his allegiance, Kopp was anti-fascist in a Europe that was on the brink of War against fascism.

Kopp sought refuge in England in March 1939, in part at the invitation of Orwell. He stayed with Eileen’s brother, Laurence O'Shaughnessy and sister-in-law Gwen, where he was gradually nursed back to health. In May, he left London for Paris.

At the outbreak of World War II in September 1939, Kopp joined the French Foreign Legion as a corporal and fought in the Battle of France in May–June 1940, barely surviving the Blitzkrieg that many of his comrades did not. Kopp was severely wounded and made prisoner but escaped from a military hospital and was able to rejoin his unit, now a defeated army, just outside of Marseilles in August. The following month, Kopp was transferred to Foreign Legion headquarters in Algeria, where he was invalided out of the army and was awarded an 80% pension.

The Inventor

Spy
Kopp set out to work as an engineer in Marseilles, in Vichy France early 1941, where he remained for two and a half years working on a method for distilling synthetic oil from lignite, common in that part of France. It is possible that the project was supported by the French admiralty under the control of French Intelligence. Kopp himself remained ambivalent about whether working on this technology would actually help the Nazis but over the next year, he expanded his Vichy network, whilst simultaneously courting British Intelligence. In March 1943, Kopp suspended development of synthetic oil because of the “high risk of the Germans wiping out the Vichy Government”. MI5, who had been monitoring his activities, decided to use his network on the recommendations of Major Anthony Blunt, who became Kopp’s controller. By June 1943, Kopp had created a new cover role as a consulting engineer for the Vichy Ministry of Industrial Production, allowing him to increase his network of operatives further; in effect, Kopp was a double agent from that moment.

In August 1943, the Gestapo arrested one of Kopp’s operatives. The following month, another operative failed to show at a pre-arranged meeting; the noose was tightening. Kopp was given the order to cease operations and a week later, he arrived in London for demobilisation.

Civilian
Kopp initially moved back in with the O’Shaughnessys, where he met Gwen’s sister, Doreen Hunton. MI5 held out some hope for retaining Kopp’s services and helped him to settle, securing work for him as an engineer, arranging his papers and finding him somewhere to live. In February 1944, Kopp moved to a flat in Canonbury Square and the following month, he married Doreen, witnessed by his friend George Orwell. A few months later, Orwell and Eileen also moved in to a flat in Canonbury Square a few doors down from the Kopps with their newly adopted son, Richard. Doreen had their first child in February 1945 but the family idyll was shattered a few weeks later when Eileen, who had taken Richard to stay at the Hunton family home in County Durham, tragically died. After the funeral, Orwell brought his son back to Canonbury Square to stay with the Kopps until he could arrange for a fulltime nurse, and returned to Europe.

Kopp moved his family to Toftcombs House in Biggar, South Lanarkshire at the end of 1945, a radical change from town life to that of a “gentleman farmer” living in grand style, with a small holding of animals on the estate. He worked as an engineer for a small factory in Edinburgh, but the income was never enough to sustain life at Toftcombs. This was the time when Kopp turned once again to innovation, creating designs and filing patents for a string of innovative creations. Unfortunately, his capacity to invent devices for modern living convenience were not matched by his ability to commercialise them, which inevitably lead to financial difficulty. Over the next few years, Kopp’s family expanded, but he was forced to sell Toftcombs and move to a series of temporary homes, haunted by the promise of contracts for his inventions that never materialised, which were taking a toll on his health.

In January 1950, Orwell died. Two months later, Kopp moved his family to France, bolstered by continued promises from potential investors in his designs. Kopp died suddenly in July 1951, arguably doing what engineers love doing best: de-constructing a complex mechanical device. There remains no trace of his grave.

Notes

References

Sources
 Wildemeersch, Marc, George Orwell’s Commander in Spain: The Enigma of Georges Kopp. Thames River Press, 2013 
 Orwell, George, Homage to Catalonia. Martin Secker & Warburg Ltd., 1938 
 Bowker, Gordon, Orwell. St. Martin's Press, 2003 
 Davison, Peter, Orwell in Spain. Penguin, 2001 
 Orwell, Sonia and Ian Angus, Orwell - An Age Like This, 1920-1940, vol. 1. Penguin, 1968

Further reading
 Topp, Sylvia, Eileen : the making of George Orwell. Unbound, 2020

External links 
 Don Bateman, Georges Kopp and the POUM Militia

1902 births
1951 deaths
Engineers from Brussels
Belgian people of the Spanish Civil War
French military personnel of World War II
Soldiers of the French Foreign Legion
International Brigades personnel
MI5 personnel
George Orwell